Evarcha brinki is a jumping spider species in the genus Evarcha. It has more similarities with Evarcha species from China, like Evacha sichuanensis and Evarcha orientalis, than many African species.

Etymology
The specific name is in honor of South African novelist André Brink.

Description
The species was described in 2011 based on a single male holotype; the type locality was near Prieska, Northern Cape.

Distribution
The species has been found in South Africa.

References

Endemic fauna of South Africa
Salticidae
Spiders of South Africa
Spiders described in 2011
Taxa named by Wanda Wesołowska